Satsuma myomphala, in Japanese: , is a species of air-breathing land snail, a terrestrial pulmonate gastropod mollusk in the family Camaenidae. This species is found in Japan.

References

External links
 http://shell.kwansei.ac.jp/~shell/pic_book/data06/myomphal.html

Camaenidae
Gastropods described in 1865